Muboraksho Abdulvahhobovich Mirzoshoyev, better known as Muboraksho (Муборакшо) or Misha (Миша), was a Pamiri singer and composer recognized alongside Daler Nazarov as a pioneer of rock music. Muboraksho was born on August 19, 1961 in Rushon district of the Gorno-Badakhshan Autonomous Region of Tajik SSR. He died on February 8, 2001.

Career
Muboraksho spent his childhood in his home village of Yemts (Russian: Емц) in  Gorno-Badakhshan Autonomous Oblast (GBAO).  At the age of 14, he composed his first song, "Chor Javon" ("Four Youths") which later became an instant hit across Tajikistan, when it hit the radio waves in the late 1980s.

From 1984 to 1987 he studied at Leningrad (present-day St. Petersburg) Leningrad Aviation Institute, but his early success solidified his desire to pursue a career in music. Muboraksho, or Misha, as fans endearingly knew him, started his professional music career in 1988 when he joined Daler Nazarov's music group after he was introduced to Nazarov by Ikbol Zavkibekov, a professional musician and son of famous Tajik actor and musician Gurminj Zavkibekov. The same year Muboraksho Mirzoshoyev's music became very popular in Tajikistan.

Some of Muboraksho's music centered on the themes of sadness and mysticism, which evoked strong emotions in his fans. He was very close and dear to all Tajiks, as his music and lyrics, some of which borrowed from the medieval mystical Persian poets were able to capture the imagination of his fanbase. His repertoire also included some very upbeat songs. One of his greatest hits was "Ay yōrum biyō" (in Tajik Ай ёрум биё) released in 1988, which has become a staple at weddings throughout Tajikistan. Tajik cinematographer Yormahmad Aralov made a film starring Daler Nazarov, which became a hit in the USSR. Muboraksho's songs were played for the character Shodkom in Kumir (The Idol), opposite of Khurshed, Nazarov's character. Muboraksho himself resisted playing the role citing that he did not want people to judge that Daler Nazarov (Khurshed) could ever be replaced by Muboraksho in real life.

Many musicians have made covers of Muboraksho's songs including n.A.T.o. The Persian rock group Kiosk also made an Iranian cover version of "Ay yōrum biyō" as "Ay Yarom Bia" featuring Mohsen Namjoo.

Muboraksho is a cultural symbol of the Tajik popular music of the 20th century, who had been among a very few artists that have had an enormous influence on the contemporary Tajik music scene. His music has been one of the primary unifying forces among the diverse ethnic groups of Tajikistan.  He is cited as one of the major influences among the current Tajik musicians.

He was married and the father of three sons. His youngest son Emomalisho is now an emerging singer who has followed his father's footsteps. Muboraksho died on February 8, 2001, from the effects of bilateral pulmonary tuberculosis.

Discography
Despite his popularity, Muboraksho never released any official album during his lifetime. In 1997, however, there was a release (without Daler Nazarov's or Muboraksho's estate permission) of two non-official albums entitled Jiray-1 and Jiray-2. The first album contained mostly Daler Nazarov's songs (except for one), while the second album had 13 of Muboraksho songs, including "Ay yorum biyo".

Singles
1988: "Ay yorum biyo"

References

External links
 Some of his video clips on Youtube

1961 births
2001 deaths
Pamiri people
People from Gorno-Badakhshan Autonomous Region
Tajikistani musicians
20th-century Tajikistani male singers